Oltroto or also spelt as Oltoroto is a Tanzanian administrative ward located in Arusha Rural District of the Arusha Region. Oltoroto means "a place to collect chalk" in Maasai language. 
The ward is bordered by Ilkiding'a to the north, Sokon II to the east, Moivo to the south and finally Olorieni and Kiranyi wards to the west. The ward is home to plateu mountain called Oldonyo Sapuk and on the east of the ward is Kivesi Hill at 1,897 meters tall. According to the 2012 census, the ward had a total population of 15,451

Economy 
Oltoroto ward's economy is dominated by subsistence agriculture that supplies the city of Arusha with farm produce goods such as milk and vegetables. There are no major industries in the ward.

Administration and neighborhoods 
The postal code for Oltoroto ward is 23216. 
The ward is divided into the following neighborhoods: 
 Ilikirevi, oltoroto
 Kivulul, Oltoroto
 Oldonyosapuk, Oltoroto
 Olgilai, Oltoroto

Education 
Oltoroto ward is home to these educational institutions: 
 Enyoito Secondary School
 Ilboru Secondary School

Healthcare
Oltoroto ward is home to the following health institutions:
 Oldonyosapuk Health Center

References

Wards of Arusha District
Wards of Arusha Region